Oshara Tradition, the northern tradition of the Picosa culture, was a Southwestern Archaic tradition centered in the area now called New Mexico and Colorado.  Cynthia Irwin-Williams developed the sequence of Archaic culture for Oshara during her work in the Arroyo Cuervo area of northwestern New Mexico.  Irwin contends that the Ancestral Puebloans developed, at least in part, from the Oshara.

Phases
This sequence defines no fewer than six phases of occupation, each identified by Projectile point forms and other less well defined artifacts.

Jay phase  (7,450 to 6,750 years before present) – Artifacts of hunter-gatherers, distinguished from earlier Paleo-Indians, and evidence suggests that people concentrated on hunting and gathering of locally available game and food, often living near canyon heads. Artifacts found include crude stone tools for processing food and long, narrow projectile points.

Bajada phase (6,750 to 5,150 years BP) – Distinguished from the Jay phase by the presence of different projectile points, different hearths, ovens, and more sites.

San Jose phase (6,750 to 3,750 years BP) – Metates and manos were used to process food.  There was an increase in both the size and number of sites during this period.  Trash heaps were also now found.

Armijo phase (3,750 to 2,750 years BP) – Cultivation of maize began during this period which allowed for food surpluses.  A new type of site was introduced, a seasonal site for gathering of up to 50 people, believed to be possible due to the stores of cultivated maize. Irwin-Williams concluded that the Oshara may have been the first Southwestern culture to cultivate crops. Projectile points were different from the concave, short projectile points of other cultures of the northern Colorado Plateau during this time, the Middle Archaic period.  Late in the  phase the points were serrated, stemmed blades.

En Medio phase (2,750 to 1,550 years BP) – During this period there was again an increase in the number of sites, but generally now at the base of cliffs, and the introduction of the use of storage pits for surplus food.  It was roughly analogous to the southwestern Basketmaker culture.

Trujillo phase (starting about 1,550 years BP) – Pottery was introduced during this period.

Sites
Oshara sites have been found near Denver, the Upper Gunnison River basin, and the Mesa Verde area of Colorado and in several sites in New Mexico and Arizona.

References
Notes

Citations

Bibliography

See also
Outline of Colorado prehistory
Prehistory of Colorado

Archaic period in North America
Archaeological cultures of North America
Hunter-gatherers of the United States
Native American history of New Mexico
Native American history of Colorado
Prehistoric cultures in Colorado
Oasisamerica cultures